Augustus Goodyear Heaton (April 28, 1844 – October 11, 1930)
 was an American artist, author and leading numismatist. He is best known for his painting The Recall of Columbus and among coin collectors for writing A Treatise on Coinage of the United States Branch Mints, which introduced numismatists to mint marks.

Biography

Personal life
Augustus Goodyear Heaton was born Augustus George Heaton in Philadelphia on April 28, 1844, to Augustus and Rosabella (née Crean) Heaton. Heaton married Adelaide Griswold in New York City on December 24, 1874, and had three children; Augustus (1875), Henry (1877) and Perry (1884) before divorcing in 1898. Heaton lived in various locations: New York City in the late 1870s; Paris, France in the early 1880s; Philadelphia (1884); Washington, D.C. (1885); and then West Palm Beach, Florida. In 1890, 1892 and 1930, he was in New Orleans where he gave art lectures and painted portraits of numerous prominent citizens.

He died at Sibley Hospital in Washington, D.C. on October 11, 1930.

Art
Heaton was a student at the Pennsylvania Academy of the Fine Arts
 with Peter F. Rothermel, and was the first American student at the École des Beaux-Arts in Paris with Alexandre Cabenel  and Leon Bonnat. Heaton was also a teacher in Philadelphia at the Art Students League of New York.

Most of Heaton's paintings are portraits, including Varina Davis, second wife of President Jefferson Davis, known as First Lady of the Confederate States of America (1892), Sculptor Chauncey Ives (1883), Opera singer Emma Nevada and Bishop Thomas Bowman of Cornell College, Iowa. (1883). His most famous painting, however, and the one of which he was most proud, was The Recall of Columbus, painted in 1882 and copyrighted in 1891 as the 400th anniversary of Christopher Columbus' landing approached. It was begun in his Paris studio and finished in Rome in the studio of American sculptor Chauncey Ives. The painting was sent to the U.S. Capitol in 1884 to be reviewed by the Joint Committee on the Library, purchased later that year for $3,000 and remains part of the United States Senate Art and History Collection.  In 1892, the painting was exhibited at the Columbian Historical Exposition in Madrid in 1892 and again in 1893 at the World's Columbian Exposition in Chicago. Also in 1893, to mark the Chicago Exposition, was the release of the Columbian Issue, a set of 16 commemorative stamps issued by the United States.  The 50 cent stamp featured The Recall of Columbus bringing the painting to the attention of the general public.

Heaton was one of the founding members of the New Rochelle Art Association, organized in 1912, and part of the well known Art Colony that had developed in New Rochelle in the early 1900s.

Other works of note are The First Mission of Washington (1862), Columbia's Night Watch (1866), Bathing Hour at Trouville (1880) and The Promoters of the New Congressional Library (1888), which is a life sized group portrait composed of eighteen prominent statesmen.  His Hardships of Emigration was also placed on a stamp for the Omaha Fair in 1898.

Numismatics
A. G. Heaton was the third president of the American Numismatic Association, governing from 1894 to 1899
. In 1893, he published his famous Treatise on Coinage of the United States Branch Mints, which revolutionized numismatics. Until its publication, collectors generally only collected by date. Heaton's Treatise, commonly referred to as just Mint Marks, showed that the coinage of the branch mints was often significantly more scarce and hence worth far more. In 1900, Heaton updated Mint Marks in the article, Late Coinage of the United States Mint, published in The Numismatist.  Heaton was a frequent contributor to The Numismatist, submitting both articles and poetry, including The Numismatist and the Burglar, published by The Numismatist in 1894 and later appeared in Heaton's book, Fancies and Thoughts in Verse.  As a collector, he owned a complete collection of US $3 and $1 gold coins from all five mints where they were coined, one of only two such collections in existence.

Publications and articles
 1882 - Memories of Italy
 1893 - A Treatise on Coinage of the United States Branch Mints
 1895 - A Tour Among the Coin Dealers, appeared in The Numismatist
 1900 - The Heart of David, The Psalmist King
 1903 - Poems by John Henry Boner (Illustrations by Heaton)
 1903 - Stolen From a Duchy's Throne by Leland Dolph Cox (Illustrations by Heaton)
 1904 - Fancies and Thoughts in Verse
 1906 - Yellowstone Letters
 1915 - Study Rewarded
 1925 - The Nutshell
 1926 - The Marseillaise
 1929 - Color; a Treatise: A Treatise

References

External links

 AskArt file on A. G. Heaton
 United States Senate Collection listing for the Recall of Columbus
 A Tour Among the Coin Dealers, with an introduction by Q. David Bowers

1844 births
1930 deaths
Artists from Philadelphia
American numismatists
19th-century American painters
American male painters
20th-century American painters
Pennsylvania Academy of the Fine Arts alumni
Artists from New Rochelle, New York
19th-century American male artists
20th-century American male artists